GraphicsMagick is a fork of ImageMagick, emphasizing stability of both programming API and command-line options. It was branched off ImageMagick's version 5.5.2 in 2002 after irreconcilable differences emerged in the developers' group.

In addition to the programming language APIs available with ImageMagick, GraphicsMagick also includes a Tcl API, called TclMagick.

GraphicsMagick is used by several websites to process large numbers of uploaded photographs.

References

External links

Slides from Web2.0 Expo 2009. (and somethin else interestin’)
Batch Processing Millions and Millions of Images

Command-line software
Free graphics software
Free raster graphics editors
Graphics libraries
Graphics software
Software forks